Vasko Eftov is a freelance journalist from North Macedonia. He is mostly known as the editor and host of the political TV show titled Vo Centar.

Carrier
Vasko Eftov started working as a journalist for the Macedonian newspaper Vecer. His first TV show was called Revers and it started airing back in 1996. In March 1999, he received an offer from Sitel which he accepted and renamed the show to Vo Centar (English: In Center). The show aired on Kanal 5 and Alfa. The show was aired and later cancelled from Alsat-M on March 23, 2015 from the Chief editor Muhamed Zakiri. It continued to be aired on Kanal 5. In his job so far he has interviewed many Macedonian and foreign public figures, including Kiro Gligorov, Branko Crvenkovski, Ljubčo Georgievski, Srgjan Kerim, Stojan Andov, Vlado Bučkovski, Pande Petrovski, Adem Demaçi, Ljube Boskovski, Ljubomir Frčkoski, Petre Roman, Zhelyu Zhelev, Bojko Borisov, Miroslav Lazanski, Momir Bulatović, Vuk Drašković, Kristijan Golubović, Pieter Feith, Christopher Hill, Jamie Shea, Peter Carington, Alois Mock, Klaus Kinkel, David Owen, Miroslav Lazanski and many others. Since April 23, 2018 he became the Director of Alfa TV.

Personal life
He is married since October 23, 2013.

Awards
In 2000, Eftov won a Golden Ladybug of Popularity in the field of journalism in 2000.

Controversy
In April 2007, 2 episodes named File: Prime Minister (part 1 and part 2) of the program Vo Centar were cancelled from the regular program with the excuse that the Kanal 5 TV station had to air a basketball game.

Bulgarian historian Bozhidar Dimitrov in December 2009 left the interview with Vasko on subject Macedonia-Bulgaria relations.

Also in January 2015 interviewer University Professor Biljana Vankovska walked away in the middle of the interview with Vasko Eftov about student protests in Skopje.

Media appearances

See also
Channel 5
Mirka Velinovska

References

Macedonian journalists
Male journalists
Living people
1977 births